Gran Concepción is the third largest conurbation in Chile, after Greater Santiago and Greater Valparaíso, with 945,650 inhabitants according to the 2012 pre census.

Overview
It takes its name after the city of Concepción, the regional capital and main city.

The agglomeration is composed of:

 Concepción
 Talcahuano
 Chiguayante
 San Pedro de la Paz
 Hualpén
 Penco
 Tomé
 Coronel
 Lota
 Hualqui

Gran Concepción has also the second largest concentration of universities in Chile. Apart from the so-called Traditional Universities, it has several private institutions. The Universidad de Concepción is the most important university in the conurbation.

There is also a commuter rail system which serves most of the communes in the conurbation: Biotren.

Commerce 
The commerce in Greater Concepcion is mostly located in Concepcion city center, also in the Mall Plaza el Trebol, in Talcahuano.

Education

Universities 
 Universidad de Concepción (Concepción)
 Universidad del Bío-Bío (Concepción)
 Universidad Católica de la Santísima Concepción (Concepción)
 Universidad Técnica Federico Santa María (Hualpén)
 Universidad de Los Lagos (Concepción)
 Universidad del Desarrollo (Concepción)
 Universidad San Sebastián (Concepción)
 Universidad Andrés Bello (Talcahuano)
 Universidad Santo Tomás (Concepción)
 Universidad Tecnológica de Chile (Talcahuano)
 Universidad de las Américas (Concepción)
 Universidad La República (Concepción)
 Universidad ARCIS (Concepción)
 Universidad Bolivariana (Concepción)
 Universidad de Pedro de Valdivia (Concepción)
 Universidad del Pacífico (Concepción)

Institutes 
 Instituto Profesional INACAP (Talcahuano)
 Instituto Profesional DuocUC (Concepción)
 Instituto Profesional Santo Tomás (Concepción)
 Instituto Profesional AIEP (Concepción)
 Instituto Profesional Providencia (Concepción)
 Instituto de Estudios Bancarios Guillermo Subercaseaux (Concepción)
 Instituto Profesional Virginio Gómez (Concepción)
 Instituto Profesional Diego Portales (Concepción)
 Instituto Tecnológico UCSC (Talcahuano)
 Instituto Profesional La Araucana (Concepción)
 Instituto Profesional Valle Central (Concepción)

References 

Concepcion
Concepción, Chile
Populated places in Concepción Province